Petakamsetti Appala Narasimham, also known as P. Appalanarasimham (1938 – 2009) was a member of the Indian Parliament.

Life

Appalanarasimham was born in Nagulapalli village, Anakapally Taluk, Vishakhapatnam district in June, 1938.

He has moved out of Nagulapalli village and worked as a civil contractor and settled near the now Gopalapatnam area. He undertook contracts including the Simhachalam ghat road, first airport contract in Visakhapatnam along with his uncle Sadaram Appalnaidu after whom Naiduquarters and Naiduthota areas are named

He was elected Samiti President independently and later joined NTR's party Telugu Desam
He was Member of Andhra Pradesh Legislative Assembly between 1983 and 1984. He was elected from Pendurthi constituency as an Independent candidate.

He was chairman of Visakhapatnam Urban Development Authority (VUDA) in 1984.

He was elected to the 8th Lok Sabha from Anakapalli (Lok Sabha constituency) as a candidate of Telugu Desam Party in 1984.

His son P.G.V.R. Naidu was also a Member of Legislative Assembly in Andhra pradesh.

His bronze statue was erected in his memory at the Diamond Park in Visakhapatnam in 2009.

References

India MPs 1984–1989
1938 births

Year of death missing
Telugu people
Lok Sabha members from Andhra Pradesh
People from Visakhapatnam district
Telugu Desam Party politicians